La Victoria de Acentejo is a town and a municipality in the northern part of the island Tenerife, Canary Islands, Spain. It is located near the north coast, 2 km southwest of La Matanza de Acentejo, 7 km northeast of La Orotava and 22 km west of the island capital Santa Cruz de Tenerife. The TF-5 motorway passes through the municipality. The population is 9,069 (2013) and the area is 18.36 km².

History 
Before the arrival of the Spaniards, La Acentejo was part of the menceyato (kingdom) of Taoro. The first and the second battles of Acentejo took place in 1494.  The Spanish under Alonso Fernández de Lugo suffered a terrible defeat at this first battle, at the place now called La Matanza de Acentejo ("The Slaughter"). The second battle resulted in a victory for the Spaniards, after which the town of La Victoria de Acentejo was founded.

See also
 List of municipalities in Santa Cruz de Tenerife

References 

Municipalities in Tenerife